"Tighten Up" is a 1968 song by Houston, Texas–based R&B vocal group Archie Bell & the Drells. It reached No.1 on both the Billboard R&B and pop charts in the spring of 1968. It is ranked No.265 on Rolling Stone magazine's list of the 500 Greatest Songs of All Time and is one of the earliest funk hits in music history.

History
"Tighten Up" was written by Archie Bell and Billy Buttler. It was one of the first songs that Archie Bell & the Drells recorded, in a session in August 1967 at the Jones Town Studio in Houston, Texas, along with a number of songs including "She's My Woman". The instrumental backing for "Tighten Up" was provided by the T.S.U. Toronadoes, the group which had developed it in their own live shows before they brought it to Archie Bell & the Drells at the suggestion of Skipper Lee Frazier, a Houston disk jockey who worked with both groups. At the recording session, the Drells worked late into the night with the Toronadoes as Archie Bell perfected the vocals.

Soon afterwards, Bell was drafted into the U.S. Army and began serving in Vietnam. Meanwhile, the song became a hit in Houston, and was picked up by Atlantic Records for distribution in April 1968. By the summer it topped both the Billboard R&B and pop charts. It also sold a million copies by May 1968, gaining an RIAA gold disc.

In the beginning of the song, Bell introduces himself and the Drells as being from Houston, Texas. According to the Billboard Book of Number One Hits by Fred Bronson, Bell had heard a comment after the Kennedy assassination in Dallas that "nothing good ever came out of Texas." Bell wanted his listeners to know "we were from Texas and we were good."

Although their leader was unavailable, the success of the single prompted the band to rush out their first album, which included the songs they had recorded in late 1967 and early 1968 with The Toronadoes.

In 1969 the group recorded their first full album with Gamble and Huff, I Can't Stop Dancing, which reached No.28 on the R&B chart.

At the 1968 Olympics, American Olympian Wyomia Tyus was doing a dance waiting at the start line of the 100 meter race in which she became the first person to repeat as Olympic Gold medalist in the event.  When interviewed later by Olympic documentarian Bud Greenspan about what she was doing, she credited dancing to this song, a current hit at the time that was being sung and played on bongos by American fans near the start line.

Charts

See also
 List of Billboard Hot 100 number-one singles of 1968
 List of number-one R&B singles of 1968 (U.S.)

References

1968 singles
Billboard Hot 100 number-one singles
Cashbox number-one singles
1968 songs
Atlantic Records singles
Songs about dancing
Archie Bell & the Drells songs